

Ichthyosaurs

Pterosaurs

Synapsids

Non-mammalian

References